Iván Rodríguez del Pozo (born 30 April 1996) is a Spanish footballer who plays as a right back.

Club career
Born in Alameda, Málaga, Andalusia, Rodríguez finished his formation with Málaga CF. On 8 December 2013, aged just 17, he made his senior debut with the reserves by starting in a 1–0 Tercera División away win against Los Villares CF.

Rodríguez scored his first senior goal on 31 January 2015, netting his team's second from the midfield in a 2–2 draw at UD Maracena. He made his first team – and La Liga – debut on 15 April 2018, coming on as a second-half substitute for injured Ignasi Miquel in a 1–2 home loss against Real Madrid.

On 19 November 2018, after becoming a starter for the first team now in Segunda División, Rodríguez renewed his contract until 2022. For the 2019–20 campaign, however, he was not registered in the first team squad due to the club's poor financial status.

On 20 January 2020, Rodríguez was loaned to fellow second division side SD Ponferradina for the remainder of the campaign. Despite featuring rarely, he signed a permanent deal with the club on 8 August, after terminating his contract with Málaga.

References

External links

1996 births
Living people
Sportspeople from the Province of Málaga
Spanish footballers
Footballers from Andalusia
Association football defenders
La Liga players
Segunda División players
Tercera División players
Atlético Malagueño players
Málaga CF players
SD Ponferradina players
Spain youth international footballers